Raame Aandalum Raavane Aandalum or simply known as RARA, is a 2021 Tamil-language political satire film directed by Arisil Moorthy, on his directorial debut. It is produced by Suriya and Jyothika of 2D Entertainment, the film features newcomer Mithun Manickam, Ramya Pandian and Vani Bhojan. The music is composed by Krish, with cinematography handled by M. Sukumar and editing done by Shiva Saravanan.

The film was released on the digital streaming platform Amazon Prime Video on 24 September 2021.

Plot 

The film begins with a farmer Kunnimuthu, going to the police station to lodge a complaint. The constable chases him out after he realises that Kunnimuthu had come to file a report of missing a pair of bulls, Karuppan and Vellaiyan. The bulls, are like children for him and his wife, Veerayi. Veerayi's father gifted the bulls during their wedding four years prior. Since then, the cows have been like their children, and the couple care for them more than their lives. Kunnimuthu's friend, Manthini looks for the bulls along with him but to no avail.

Once, reporter Narmadha comes to the village to file a documentary and Manthini helps her. In the process, he finds Kunnimuthu being charged for trying to steal bulls, when in reality, he was searching for his bulls. Narmadha rescues him and learns of it. She decides to help them with her channel. Kunnimuthu reveals that the bulls went missing the night he shamed a minister on stage. The minister had borrowed the bulls, staging it to be give as gifts for farmers. When the minister's men beat the bulls to bring them onstage, Kunnimuthu attacks the minister and brings the bulls away, in the process revealing that the presentation ceremony was not true. Narmadha realizes that the minister had his men abducted the bulls. She sensationalizes the issue and it gets total Tamil Nadu media coverage. The minister panics when he finds out that the bulls were sold.

He comes to the village to make peace with Kunnimuthu, offering him a new pair of cows, only to be insulted by Veerayi. Soon, the sensation wears off, and the village goes back to normal. Narmadha, though, continues helping them. She finds out that not only the bulls are missing, but also the facilities in the village. The government had made it look like the village was funded to build ponds and schools, when in reality, nothing happened. Narmadha makes YouTube videos and gets in touch with a lawyer who belonged to the village. He helps her file a case in high court to make sure the government does its job. Kunnimuthu, while travelling, finds his bulls. He brings them back to his village to find out that the construction work for ponds and other facilities are happening. The family has an emotional reunion with Karuppan and Vellaiyan.

Cast 
 Mithun Manickam as Kunnimuthu
 Ramya Pandian as Veerayi
 Vani Bhojan as Narmadha Periyasamy
 Vadivel Murugan as Manthinni

Production 
In January 2021, actress Ramya Pandian was reportedly signed for a women-centric film produced by Suriya's 2D Entertainment banner. This film was reportedly directed by newcomer Arisil Moorthy, who revealed that "the storyline is close to the heart", further being considered as an "impactful political satire dealing with human emotions". The film began production on 1 February 2021, and Vani Bhojan joined the film as one of the leads, along with newcomer Mithun Manickam. Shooting took place in Tirunelveli and its surrounding areas and was completed within 50 days.

Soundtrack 

The film's soundtrack is composed by playback singer Krish. He started working on the soundtrack when the film's production began and completed the recording works, including the final mixing and mastering by April 2021. The film's soundtrack featured eight tracks; five songs, two themes and an instrumental track of the song, with lyrics written by Yugabharathi, Vivek, Senthildass Velayutham, and Ve. Madhankumar. Sony Music India acquired the film's rights and released the soundtrack on 10 September 2021.

Release 
In August 2021, Suriya signed a four-film deal with Amazon Prime Video stating that those films which were produced by 2D Entertainment will directly premiere on the streaming service, including Raame Aandalum Raavane Aandalum, which would be the first film to be streamed as a part of the four-film deal. This film was released on 24 September 2021.

Reception
Subha J Rao of Film Companion wrote, "The film, directed by Arisil Moorthy and starring Ramya Pandian, Mithun Manickam and two Kangeyam bulls, delivers a part of what it promises."

References

External links 
 

2021 films
2021 drama films
2020s Tamil-language films
Indian drama films
Amazon Prime Video original films